Sadłowo may refer to the following places:
Sadłowo, Kuyavian-Pomeranian Voivodeship (north-central Poland)
Sadłowo, Masovian Voivodeship (east-central Poland)
Sadłowo, Warmian-Masurian Voivodeship (north Poland)
Sadłowo, West Pomeranian Voivodeship (north-west Poland)